Harbor Gateway Transit Center, formerly Artesia Transit Center, is a large bus station at the southern end of the Harbor Transitway that serves as a transport hub (known locally as a transit center) for the South Bay region of Los Angeles County including the Harbor Gateway neighborhood of Los Angeles and cities of Carson, Gardena, and Torrance. The station consists of one large island platform with 12 bus bays and a 980 space park and ride parking lot located in the southwest corner of Interstate 110 (Harbor Freeway) and California State Route 91 (Gardena Freeway).

The station is one of the stops on J Line, a bus rapid transit route which runs between El Monte, Downtown Los Angeles and San Pedro as part of the Metro Busway system. J Line buses serve the station twenty-four hours a day; the headway between buses is about four minutes during peak periods, with less frequent service at other times.

The Harbor Transitway also serves as a hub for Metro Local, Metro Express, GTrans, and Torrance Transit buses. Three game-day shuttle services also serve the station: the Dodger Stadium Express, the SoFi Stadium Shuttle (via GTrans) and Galaxy Express (to Dignity Health Sports Park).

The station, originally called the Artesia Transit Center, was built between 1989 and 1996 as part of the Harbor Transitway project and opened to passengers on August 1, 1996.

History 
The transit center, originally named the Artesia Transit Center, was built as the southern terminus of the Harbor Transitway, a  shared-use express bus corridor and high-occupancy vehicle lanes (later converted to high occupancy toll (HOT) lanes) running in the median of Interstate 110 (Harbor Freeway) north to Downtown Los Angeles.

After about 20 years of planning and construction, the Harbor Transitway was opened on June 26, 1996, at a cost of $498 million. Because of uncertainty on the opening date, buses would not start using the facility until a few weeks later on August 1, 1996. The project was built by the California Department of Transportation (Caltrans) and the transit facilities would be operated by Los Angeles County Metropolitan Transportation Authority (Metro) after completion.

Caltrans envisioned that the transit center and transitway would offer a similar function to the El Monte Station located at the end of the El Monte Busway, an older but operationally similar facility east of Downtown Los Angeles, offering a large parking lot where commuters would park their cars and ride buses to downtown and serving as a hub in a hub-and-spoke system for the South Bay where riders can transfer between buses. In 1993, Metro staff recommended the creation of a "dual hub" system with a trunk route that served both the Harbor Transitway and the older El Monte Busway. Ultimately, the Metro Board of Directors decided to largely continue to running bus routes as they had before.

Ridership on the Harbor Transitway was radically lower than expected: Caltrans had projected that 65,200 passengers would travel along the Harbor Transitway each day, but after 10 years, ridership fell far below those predictions, with the route seeing just 3,000 passengers per weekday in 2004. That amount is low compared to the El Monte Busway, which had 32,000 boardings a day in November 2000.

On November 18, 2000, a  section of the Harbor Freeway south of State Route 91 was widened, and new bus new stations were added on the shoulder, allowing some bus routes to be extended south to San Pedro.

Metro returned to its plan for a dual-hub route in 2009, proposing a new bus rapid transit service called the Silver Line (now J Line) utilizing both the Harbor Transitway and the El Monte Busway. The new higher frequency service would be funded by converting both corridors into high occupancy toll (HOT) lanes, to be branded as the Metro ExpressLanes. The Silver Line began operations on December 13, 2009, with Metro planning to refurbish the aging stations along both corridors over the coming years, including the Artesia Transit Center. As part of the change, several Metro routes would now terminate at the transit center.

Improvements to the transit center started in December 2010 with the installation of bike lockers, adding improved lighting, and the repurposing of an existing building as a Sheriff's substation. In October 2011, the Metro board voted to rename the Artesia Transit Center to the Harbor Gateway Transit Center. Landscaping was improved in October 2012, a self-cleaning public toilet was opened in February 2013, and monitors with bus departure information were activated in March 2013. Signage improvements were installed in phases starting in 2013, adding new station name signs, decals on walls, wayfinding signs, new entry pylons, and an 80-foot monument pylon visible from the Harbor Freeway. A total of four Transit Access Pass (TAP) card ticket vending machines were added at the transit center by early 2017 to support all-door boarding on the J Line. Pre-payment of fares and all-door boarding reduces the time buses need to remain stopped at stations.

Layout 
Harbor Gateway Transit Center consists of one large island platform with 12 bus bays and a 980 space park and ride parking lot located in the southwest corner of Interstate 110 (Harbor Freeway) and California State Route 91 (Gardena Freeway). The transit center is connected to the Harbor Transitway by a flyover ramp. The station is located near the Harbor Gateway neighborhood of Los Angeles and cities of Carson, Gardena, and Torrance.

The platform can be accessed by pedestrians from West 182nd Street. The parking lot can be accessed from West 182nd Street or Vermont Avenue near Artesia Boulevard.

The station also has a Sheriff's substation, a self-cleaning public toilet, and TAP card vending machines.

The Harbor Gateway Transit Center also houses a free-standing art installation as part of the Los Angeles County Metropolitan Transportation Authority's art program that commissions artists to integrate artworks into its stations for the enjoyment of transit customers. The artwork was installed on January 28, 2013. The name Paraje is Spanish for a resting place between two destinations and the artwork was inspired by the nearby Gardena Willows Wetlands Preserve.

Services 

Harbor Gateway Transit Center is used by the Metro J Line bus rapid transit route which runs between the El Monte Station in El Monte, Downtown Los Angeles and the Harbor Gateway Transit Center, with select trips continuing onto San Pedro. The J Line is part of the Metro Busway system.

Harbor Gateway Transit Center is also served by several local bus routes: Los Angeles Metro Bus route  that runs between Willowbrook and San Pedro,  that runs to San Pedro,  that runs to Rancho Palos Verdes; GTrans route 2 that runs between West Athens and Harbor City neighborhood of Los Angeles and route 4 to Lawndale; and Torrance Transit route 1 that runs between Torrance and South Los Angeles, 4X that runs between Torrance and Downtown Los Angeles, 6 that runs between Torrance and Compton, and 13 that runs between Redondo Beach and Compton.

The station is also served by the Dodger Stadium Express shuttle that operates on game days during baseball season and the Galaxy Express shuttle to Dignity Health Sports Park that operates on game days during soccer season.

References 

Los Angeles Metro Busway stations
Harbor Gateway, Los Angeles
J Line (Los Angeles Metro)
Bus stations in Los Angeles
Transport infrastructure completed in 1996
1996 establishments in California
Transportation buildings and structures in Los Angeles